The bluelip haplo (Astatoreochromis straeleni) is a species of fish in the family Cichlidae. It is found in Burundi, the Democratic Republic of the Congo, Tanzania, and Zambia.

Its natural habitat is rivers. It is not considered a threatened species by the IUCN.

The specific name honours the director of the Royal Belgian Institute of Natural Sciences, Victor van Straelen (1889-1964).

References

Bluelip haplo
Fish described in 1944
Taxonomy articles created by Polbot